Budiatychi is a village in the Volodymyr Raion (district) of the Volyn Oblast (province) in western Ukraine near Novovolynsk.

History 
Budiatychi is a possible birthplace of Volodymyr the Great, Grand Prince of Kiev, ruler of Rus'.

References

Sources
  
  . — P. 259.

External links 
 Budyatychi, google maps

Villages in Volodymyr Raion